Joseph Verner Alexander Megson (20 April 1883 – 14 July 1964) was an Australian rules footballer who played with Essendon and Richmond in the Victorian Football League (VFL).

Notes

External links 

1883 births
1964 deaths
Australian rules footballers from Melbourne
Essendon Football Club players
Richmond Football Club players
Richmond Football Club (VFA) players
People from Collingwood, Victoria